"I'm Gwine ober de Mountain", also spelled "I'm Going ober de Mountain", is an American song written by the blackface minstrel composer Dan Emmett. The song may be a precursor to "Dixie", as evidenced by its line "Away down south in de Kentuck brake"; in comparison, "Dixie" includes the line, "Away down south in Dixie". The first phrase of "I'm Gwine ober de Mountain" was probably modeled after "The Spinning Wheel", an older English song.

Notes

References
Nathan, Hans (1962). Dan Emmett and the Rise of Early Negro Minstrelsy. Norman: University of Oklahoma Press.

Songs about mountains
Blackface minstrel songs
19th-century songs
Songs written by Dan Emmett